Michael Souchak (May 10, 1927 – July 10, 2008) was an American professional golfer who won fifteen events on the PGA Tour in the 1950s and 1960s, and played for the Ryder Cup teams in 1959 and 1961.

Early years
Born and raised in Berwick, Pennsylvania, Souchak served two years as a gunner in the U.S. Navy. He then attended Duke University in Durham, North Carolina, and played both golf and football for the Blue Devils, as an end and placekicker. He was inducted into the Duke Sports Hall of Fame in 1976.

Tour record-setter
In his first win at the 1955 Texas Open, Souchak set and tied several records. In the first round, he tied the tour's 18-hole record with a 60. This record was finally broken in 1977 by Al Geiberger's 59, and then lowered by Jim Furyk's 58 in 2016. This first round also included a record-breaking 27 on the back nine holes, a record that was tied by Andy North in 1975, Billy Mayfair in 2001 and Robert Gamez in 2004, and broken by Corey Pavin in 2006. He then finished with a 72-hole record of 257 (27-under-par). This record stood until 2001, when Mark Calcavecchia shot 256 at the Phoenix Open, and lowered two years later by Tommy Armour III (254) at the Texas Open. Justin Thomas lowered the mark to 253 in 2017 at the Sony Open in Hawaii.

Souchak's fifteen PGA Tour wins came between 1955 and 1964, with his best year in 1956 (four victories). He won three tour titles in 1959, and was on an early cover of Sports Illustrated in January 1956, for its preview of the Bing Crosby Pro-Am.

Near misses in majors
Souchak had eleven top-10 finishes at major championships, including third-place finishes at the U.S. Open in 1959 and 1960. Souchak led after 36 holes in 1960 with a new record score of 135, which was 7-under-par. But he struggled on the final hole of the third round (which was played on the same day as the fourth round,) making a triple bogey, and couldn't regain his composure. Arnold Palmer, who had been seven strokes behind entering the final round, shot 65 to win the championship.

Souchak played on the Senior PGA Tour (now called the PGA Tour Champions) from its inception in 1980 until 1990. His best finish was second place in his very first tournament, the Atlantic City Senior International in 1980.

Souchak moved from North Carolina to Florida in 1970 and became the first head pro at the Innisbrook Resort and Golf Club in Palm Harbor, and resided in Belleair with his wife Nancy. He had four children: sons Mike, Frank, and Chris Souchak and daughter Patti Taylor, as well as five grandchildren. He ran Golf Car Systems, a preventive maintenance firm, with his partner Bill Dodd until his death from complications of a heart attack in 2008.

Professional wins (19)

PGA Tour wins (15)

PGA Tour playoff record (0–3)

Other wins (4)
This list is probably incomplete
1955 Havana Invitational
1959 Carolinas PGA Championship
1967 Michigan Open
1968 Michigan PGA Championship

Results in major championships

CUT = missed the half-way cut
"T" indicates a tie for a place
R16, QF, SF = Round in which player lost in PGA Championship match play

Summary

Most consecutive cuts made – 19 (1958 PGA – 1965 Masters)
Longest streak of top-10s – 2 (twice)

U.S. national team appearances
Ryder Cup: 1959 (winners), 1961 (winners)
Hopkins Trophy: 1956 (winners)

See also
List of golfers with most PGA Tour wins

References

External links

Duke University Athletics – Mike Souchak

American male golfers
Duke Blue Devils men's golfers
PGA Tour golfers
PGA Tour Champions golfers
Ryder Cup competitors for the United States
Golfers from Pennsylvania
Duke Blue Devils football players
Players of American football from Pennsylvania
People from Berwick, Pennsylvania
People from Belleair, Florida
1927 births
2008 deaths
United States Navy personnel of World War II
United States Navy sailors